Remote Oceania is the part of Oceania settled within the last 3,000 to 3,500 years, comprising south-eastern Island Melanesia and islands in the open Pacific east of the Solomon Islands: Fiji, Micronesia, New Caledonia, New Zealand, Polynesia, the Santa Cruz Islands, and Vanuatu.

See also
 East Melanesian Islands
 Micronesian navigation
 Near Oceania
 Polynesian navigation
 Remote Oceanic languages

References

Regions of Oceania